Decas is a compilation album by the American metal band As I Lay Dying. It features three newly recorded songs, four cover songs, four remixes and one re-recording. The album was released through Metal Blade Records on November 4, 2011, in Germany, Austria, and Switzerland; on November 7 in the UK and the rest of Europe; and on November 8 in the US.

The release of Decas is meant to commemorate As I Lay Dying's tenth anniversary of being a band, and was also described by the group as a gift to their fans for their support over the years. Coinciding with the release of Decas, As I Lay Dying embarked on the "A Decade of Destruction" tour running from November through December 2011 with openers Of Mice & Men, The Ghost Inside, Iwrestledabearonce and Sylosis.

"Paralyzed" was first released as a YouTube lyric video on September 13, 2011. Also, on November 7, the day before the album's US release, "Paralyzed" was released on iTunes as a free download. The track was originally intended to be the iTunes pre-order bonus for As I Lay Dying's previous album, The Powerless Rise. "War Ensemble" was previously released in a Limited Edition Free Download of the Video Game, Homefront soundtrack. "Electric Eye" was first available to stream via Noisecreep on October 3, 2011.

Track listing

Personnel 
As I Lay Dying
 Tim Lambesis – lead vocals
 Nick Hipa – lead guitar, backing vocals
 Phil Sgrosso – rhythm guitar, backing vocals
 Josh Gilbert – bass, clean vocals
 Jordan Mancino – drums

References 

As I Lay Dying (band) compilation albums
2011 compilation albums
Metal Blade Records compilation albums